is a station in Masuda, Shimane Prefecture, Japan.

Lines
 West Japan Railway Company (JR West)
 San'in Main Line

Layout
The station has a side platform and two tracks.

Adjacent stations
West Japan Railway Company (JR West)

Railway stations in Japan opened in 1923
Railway stations in Shimane Prefecture
Sanin Main Line